Archips pensilis is a species of moth of the family Tortricidae. It is found in India.

The larvae feed on Citrus species, including Citrus aurantium.

References

Moths described in 1920
Archips
Moths of Asia